Operation Olympic Games was a covert and still unacknowledged campaign of sabotage by means of cyber disruption, directed at Iranian nuclear facilities likely by the United States and Israel.  As reported, it is one of the first known uses of offensive cyber weapons.  Started under the administration of George W. Bush in 2006, Olympic Games was accelerated under President Obama, who heeded Bush's advice to continue cyber attacks on the Iranian nuclear facility at Natanz. Bush believed that the strategy was the only way to prevent an Israeli conventional strike on Iranian nuclear facilities.

History
During Bush's second term, General James Cartwright, then head of United States Strategic Command, along with other intelligence officials presented Bush with sophisticated code that would act as an offensive cyber weapon. "The goal was to gain access to the Natanz plant's industrial computer controls ... the computer code would invade the specialized computers that command the centrifuges." Collaboration happened with Israel's SIGINT intelligence service, Unit 8200. Israel's involvement was important to the United States because the former had "deep intelligence about operations at Natanz that would be vital to making the cyber attack a success." Additionally, American officials wanted to "dissuade the Israelis from carrying out their own preemptive strike against Iranian nuclear facilities." To prevent a conventional strike, Israel had to be deeply involved in Operation Olympic Games. The computer virus created by the two countries became known as "the bug," and Stuxnet by the IT community once it became public. The malicious software temporarily halted approximately 1,000 of the 5,000 centrifuges from spinning at Natanz.

A programming error in "the bug" caused it to spread to computers outside of Natanz. When an engineer "left Natanz and connected [his] computer to the Internet, the American- and Israeli-made bug failed to recognize that its environment had changed." The code replicated on the Internet and was subsequently exposed for public dissemination. IT security firms Symantec and Kaspersky Lab have since examined Stuxnet. It is unclear whether the United  States or Israel introduced the programming error.

Significance
According to the Atlantic Monthly, Operation Olympic Games is "probably the most significant covert manipulation of the electromagnetic spectrum since World War II, when Polish cryptanalysts broke the Enigma cipher that allowed access to Nazi codes." The New Yorker claims Operation Olympic Games is "the first formal offensive act of pure cyber sabotage by the United States against another country, if you do not count electronic penetrations that have preceded conventional military attacks, such as that of Iraq's military computers before the 2003 invasion of Iraq." Therefore, "American and Israeli official action can stand as justification for others."

The Washington Post reported that Flame malware was also part of Olympic Games.

Leak investigation
In June 2013, it was reported that Cartwright was the target of a year-long investigation by the US Department of Justice into the leak of classified information about the operation to the US media. In March 2015, it was reported that the investigation had stalled amid concerns that necessary evidence for prosecution was too sensitive to reveal in court.

Referring to unnamed sources within the CIA and NSA, the documentary film Zero Days claims that the Stuxnet/Olympic Games malware was just a small part of a much larger mission to infiltrate and compromise Iran—"Nitro Zeus" (NZ).

See also
 Operation Merlin

References

Further reading

Olympic Games
National Security Agency operations
Nuclear program of Iran
Cyberwarfare in Iran
2006 establishments in the United States
Covert operations